

Cities by prefecture

Aichi
 Takahama
 City of Kawara (roof tiles)
 Toyota, Nagoya
 Castle Town of Toyota
 Yatomi
 City of Goldfish

Akita

Aomori

Chiba

Ehime
 Matsuyama
 Town of Botchan (Botchan by Natsume Sōseki)
 Imabari
 City of Towels
 City of Kawara (roof tiles) (Kikuma)
 Uchiko
 City of Kite
 City of White Walled
 Uwajima
 City of Bullfighting
 Hometown of Pearl

Fukui
 Sabae
 City of Glasses

Fukuoka
 Fukuoka
 City of Yatai (street stalls)
 Yanagawa
 Venice of Japan
 City of Water
 Yame
 Place of Yame-tea
 Munakata (Okinoshima)
 Island of God

Fukushima

Gifu
 Gifu
 City of Fashion
 Ōgaki
 City of Water
 Ena (Akechi)
 Taishō Romantic Town

Gunma
 Maebashi
 City of Water
 Shimonita
 Town of Konnyaku

Hiroshima
 Fukuyama
 City of Roses (Rose City)
 City of Geta (Japanese footwear)
 Fuchū
 Home of Oomurasaki (great purple, the national butterfly of Japan)
 Town of White Walled (Jyougecho)
 Onomichi
 City of Hills (City of Slopes)
 City of Movies
 Innoshima
 Island of Flower
 Home of Hassaku
 Akitakata
 City of Kagura (Yachiyo-Kagura, Midori-Kagura)
 Kitahiroshima (Chiyodacho)
 Town of Kagura (Chiyoda-Kagura)
 Kure
 City of Hills (City of Slopes)
 Hiroshima
 City of Peace (International City of Peace and Culture)
 City of Rivers
 City of Water
 Venice of Japan
 Hatsukaichi (Miyajima)
 Itsukushima
 Island of God
 Kumano
 City of Brush

Hokkaidō
 Kushiro (Akan)
 Hometown of Tanchō (wintering ground of red-crowned crane)
 Furano
 City of Flowers
 Hakodate
 City of Lights
 Otaru
 City of Hills (City of Slopes)
 Venice of Japan
 Teshikaga (Mashuko)
 Lake of God
 Rishiri, Rishirifuji (Rishiritou)
 Island of Flower
 Rebun (Rebuntou)
 Island of Flower
 Haboro (Yagishiritou)
 Island of Flower
 Kaibatou
 Island of Flower

Hyōgo
 Takarazuka
 City of Music
 Kōbe
 City of Lights
 City of Fashion
 Town of Shoes (Nagata)
 Minamiawaji
 City of Kawara (roof tiles)
 Tatsuno
 City of Aka-tombo (red dragonfly) (Japanese nursery song)
 Awaji, Sumoto, Minamiawaji (Awajishima)
 Island of Flower
 Island of Mythologies
 Minamiawaji (Nushima)
 Island of Mythologies

Ibaraki

Ishikawa

Iwate
 Tono
 City of Folktales
 Hanamaki (Ohasama)
 Town of Hayachine-Kagura

Kagawa
 Ayagawa
 Home of Sanuki Udon
 Mitoyo
 Home of Urashima Tarō
 Takamatsu
 Home of Momotarō story
 Town of Bonsai
 Marugame
 City of Uchiwa (Japanese rigid paper fan)

Kagoshima
 Kagoshima
 Naples of the Orient
 Venice of Japan
 City of Ishin (Meiji Restoration)
 City of Streetcars
 Tokunoshima, Isen, Amagi, Kagoshima (Tokunoshima)
 Town of Bullfighting
 Izumi
 Hometown (wintering ground) of Nabezuru (hooded crane), Kurozuru (common crane), Manazuru (white-necked crane)
 Ōshima-gun (Okinoerabujima)
 Island of Flower

Kanagawa
 Kamakura
 Ancient City
 City of History
 Minamiashigara
 Home of Kintaro (a Japanese folk hero)

Kōchi
 Kōchi
 Birthplace of Yosakoi-Matsuri (traditional summer dance festival)

Kumamoto
 Kumamoto
 City of Woods
 Nagasu
 Town of Goldfish
 Uki
 City of Dekopon (a Japanese orange_

Kyoto
 Kyoto
 Kyo
 Ancient City
 City of History
 Ine
 Home of Urashima Tarō
 Uji
 Place of Uji-tea
 Maizuru (Kammurijima)
 Island of God

Mie
 Iga
 Hometown of Ninja
 Shima
 Home of Urashima Tarō
 Hometown of Pearl

Miyagi
 Sendai
 City of Trees (City of Green) (Capital with the Groves)
 Shibata
 City of Chrysanthemum

Miyazaki
 Takachiho
 Town of Mythologies
 Town of Takachiho-Kagura

Nagano

Nagasaki
 Nagasaki
 City of Peace
 City of Hills (City of Slopes)
 City of Lights
 City of Streetcars
 Naples of the Orient (Naples of Japan)
 Iki (Iki Island)
 Island of Mythologies

Nara
 Nara
 Ancient City
 Yamatokoriyama
 City of Goldfish

Niigata
 Ojiya
 Home of Nishikigoi
 City of Bullfighting
 Niigata, Shirone
 City of Kite
 Sado
 Island of Flower

Ōita
 Beppu
 Naples of the Orient
 Hot spring Capital of the World
 Bungotakada
 City of Shōwa

Okayama
 Okayama
 Hometown of Momotarō
 Kurashiki
 City of White Walled
 Venice of Japan
 Bisei
 Home of Stars
 Kasaoka (Manabeshima, Takashima)
 Island of Flower
 Island of Mythologies
 Takahashi (Nariwacho)
 Town of Bitchu-Kagura

Okinawa
 Naha
 Capital of the Ryūkyū Kingdom
 Itoman
 City of Peace
 Uruma
 City of Bullfighting
 Nanjo (Kudakajima)
 Island of God
 Island of Mythologies
 Uruma (Hamahigashima)
 Island of God
 Island of Mythologies
 Nakijin (Kourijima)
 Island of God
 Kohama
 Hometown of Churasan

Osaka
 Osaka
 Naniwa
 City of Water
 Venice of Japan
 City of Business
 City of Kuidaore (eat until you drop)
 Sakai
 Venice of Japan
 Izumisano
 Rinku Town
 City of Towels
 Kishiwada
 City of Danjiri Matsuri

Saga
 Karatsu
 City of Karatsu Kunchi
 Kawasoe
 City of Nori

Saitama
 Saitama
 Town of Bonsai
 Kazo
 City of Koinobori
 Kounosu, Iwatsuki
 Town of Dolls
 Town of Hina-ningyo (dolls for Girls' Dayy)
 Town of Gogatsu-ningyo (dolls for Children's Day)

Shiga
 Kōka
 Hometown of Ninja

Shimane
 Matsue
 City of Water
 Venice of Japan
 City of Kawara (roof tiles)
 Izumo
 City of Mythologies
 Gotsu (Sakuraecho)
 Town of Kagura (Omoto-Kagura)
 Hamada (Kanagi)
 Town of Iwami-Kagura
 Oda
 City of Iwami Ginzan Silver Mine
 Okinoshima
 Island of Pictures
 Island of Flower
 Town of Bullfighting

Shizuoka
 Atami
 City of Lights
 Naples of the Orient
 Fuji
 City of Paper
 Hamamatsu
 City of Music
 Oyama
 Hometown of Kintaro (a folk hero)
 Shizuoka, Okabe, Fujieda
 Places of Shizuoka-tea

Tochigi

Tokushima
 Tokushima
 Birthplace of Awa Dance Festival

Tokyo
 Shibuya, Harajuku
 Town for Young People
 Sugamo
 Obaachan no Harajuku (Grandma's Harajuku)
 Akihabara
 Town for Otaku
 The Electric Town
 Katsushika-Shibamata
 Hometown of Tora-san (from the film series Otoko wa Tsurai yo)
 Fuchū
 City of Woods
 Shinjuku
 City of the Beasts (from manga and anime series Hyper Police)

Tottori
 Kurayoshi
 City of White Walled
 City of Red Roof
 Sakaiminato
 City of Yōkai (from the manga series Ge Ge Ge no Kitaro)

Toyama
 Toyama
 City of Medicine

Wakayama

Yamagata
 Higashine
 City of Cherries
 Nanyō
 City of Chrysanthemum

Yamaguchi
 Hagi
 City of "Ishin" (Meiji Restoration)
 Yanai
 City of White Walled
 Iwakuni
 Taishō Romantic Town
 Shimonoseki
 City of Fuku (pufferfish) ("Fuku": Happiness)
 Shimonoseki (Futaoijima)
 Island of Mythologies
 Shunan
 Hometown of Nabezuru (wintering ground of hooded crane)

Yamanashi
 Hokuto (Nagasaka)
 Town of Oomurasaki (great purple, the national butterfly of Japan)

Cities referred to as Little Kyoto, by region
In Japanese .

Tōhoku
 Hirosaki, Aomori
 Iwadeyama, Miyagi
 Kakunodate, Akita
 Morioka, Iwate
 Murata, Miyagi
 Sakata, Yamagata
 Tono, Iwate
 Yamagata, Yamagata
 Yuzawa, Akita

Kantō, Kōshinetsu
 Ashikaga, Tochigi
 Iida, Nagano
 Iiyama, Nagano
 Kamo, Niigata
 Koga, Ibaraki
 Ogawa, Saitama
 Ranzan, Saitama
 Sano, Tochigi
 Tochigi, Tochigi
 Yugawara, Kanagawa

Chūbu (Hokuriku, Tōkai)
 Gujohachiman, Gifu
 Inuyama, Aichi
 Johana, Toyama
 Kanazawa, Ishikawa
 Nishio, Aichi
 Obama, Fukui
 Takayama, Gifu

Kinki
 Igaueno, Mie
 Izushi, Hyogo
 Sasayama, Hyogo
 Tatsuno, Hyogo

Chūgoku (San'in, San'yō)
 Hagi, Yamaguchi
 Kurayoshi, Tottori
 Matsue, Shimane
 Onomichi, Hiroshima
 Takahashi, Okayama
 Takehara, Hiroshima
 Tsuwano, Shimane
 Tsuyama, Okayama
 Yamaguchi, Yamaguchi

Shikoku
 Nakamura, Kōchi
 Ōzu, Ehime

Kyūshū
 Asakura, Fukuoka
 Chiran, Kagoshima
 Hita, Oita
 Hitoyoshi, Kumamoto
 Imari, Saga
 Kitsuki, Oita
 Nichinan, Miyazaki
 Ogi, Saga

Cities referred to as Little Edo, by region
In Japanese .

Kantō
 Atsugi, Kanagawa
 Katori, Chiba
 Kawagoe, Saitama
 Otaki, Chiba
 Tochigi, Tochigi

Tōkai
 Iwata, Shizuoka (Asaba, Shizuoka)

Kinki
 Hikone, Shiga

See also

 Lists of nicknames – nickname list articles on Wikipedia

Nicknames
Japan